Saint Catherine Convent of New Julfa, (Armenian: ,), is an Armenian Apostolic church in New Julfa, Iran. It is located in Charsou neighbourhood of New Julfa, next to St. John the Baptist Church.

History 

Saint Catherine Convent was built in 1623 by Khoja Yeghiazar, the ancestor of the famous Lazarian family (ru) and grandfather of Aghazar Lazarian (hy), for his sisters, Catherine and Tajlum. 
The first female school in New Julfa, Catherine School, was opened there in 1858. In 1900, a separate building was built for the school called "St. Catherine School", which still exists today. Another two-storey building was built on the initiative of Bagrat Vardazarian as an orphanage-workshop, which several of its rooms were used for carpet weaving. In 1964, its rooms were destroyed and John Tunian funded to build an orphanage, which later served as a nursing home. The convent used to be famous for its cold well, which was used by the locals. In the 1970s, the well became unusable due to the widening of the nearby street.

See also
Iranian Armenians
List of Armenian churches in Iran

References 

 Architecture in Iran
Churches in Isfahan
Armenian Apostolic churches in Iran
Oriental Orthodox congregations established in the 17th century
Tourist attractions in Isfahan